The Altar frontal from Avià is a rare Romanesque altar frontal exhibited at the National Art Museum of Catalonia in Barcelona. It is the front of the altar of the church of St. Mary of Avià, in the county of Berguedà, later moved to MNAC Barcelona, while the church has a replica in place. It is dated to the 13th century or earlier, and was painted by an unknown artist.

The frontal is painted in tempera on a wood panel, with parchment overlaps, pastiglia stucco relief decoration and remains of additional vanished metal plates. It is divided into five areas, dominated by the central Virgin and Child. The figures are elongated, with Byzantine-style costumes and  frontal poses. Four scenes surround the central figures: the Annunciation and Visitation, Nativity, the Epiphany and the Presentation of Jesus in the temple. Both the frame and the divisions between the compartments are decorated with gilded  gypsum plaster, imitating precious metal.

References

Further reading

External links
The frontal at Museum's website
The Art of medieval Spain, A.D. 500-1200, an exhibition catalog from The Metropolitan Museum of Art Libraries (available online as PDF), which contains material on this altar frontal (no. 171)

Paintings of the Madonna and Child
12th-century paintings
13th-century paintings
Catalan paintings
Romanesque paintings
Paintings in the collection of the Museu Nacional d'Art de Catalunya
Annunciation in Christian art
Nativity of Jesus in art
Altar frontal